Hollerado was a Canadian indie rock band from Ottawa, Ontario. Formed in 2007, the band consisted of Menno Versteeg (lead vocals, guitar), Nixon Boyd (lead guitar, backing vocals), Dean Baxter (bass, backing vocals) and Jake Boyd (drums, backing vocals). Hollerado went on to release four studio albums, before disbanding in 2019. They were  nominated for awards such as the Juno Award that included Best New Group Award at the 2011 Juno Awards.

History

2007–2012: Formation & Record in a Bag
Three of the four members of Hollerado grew up on the same street in Manotick, Ontario, a suburb of Ottawa. Hollerado later recorded and periodically lived in Montreal, Quebec where they gained attention as one of Montreal's "top up-and-coming bands". The line-up includes lead singer and guitarist Menno Versteeg, lead guitarist Nixon Boyd, bassist Dean Baxter, and drummer Jake Boyd. Since its inception in April 2007 the band has shared the stage with hard-rocker Andrew W.K. and Montreal's The Stills and Malajube, and was hand-picked by Jack White to open for his newest group, The Dead Weather. The band has also played festivals such as SXSW, NXNE, Pop Montreal, Rifflandia Music Festival and Sled Island in Calgary, Alberta, Canada.

In April and May 2009, the band accompanied The Stills and other Canadian indie rock delegates to the TransmitCHINA conference, an event established to promote cultural and musical exchange between the Asian and Canadian music markets. Hollerado played the conference showcase in Beijing to kick off its two-week tour of China.

In 2009, Hollerado self-released its debut album Record in a Bag as a free digital download. Originally from the band's Demo in a Bag 5. EP, In February 2010, music label Royal Mountain Records along with Arts & Crafts re-released Record in a Bag. The album's lead single "Americanarama" drew press for its music video starring The Kids in the Hall comedian Dave Foley in a parody of American Apparel founder and CEO Dov Charney. The album has been favourably compared to the music of Supergrass, Stephen Malkmus, and Weezer.

In February 2009, Hollerado embarked on a 28-day "residency tour". The band played "seven bars in seven cities seven days a week", visiting T.T. The Bears in Boston, Piano's in New York City, Pipeline Gas Bar in Lacolle, Quebec, Casbah in Hamilton, Sneaky Dee's in Toronto, Cafe Dekcuf in Ottawa, and Barfly in Montreal.

In 2010, Hollerado toured with Free Energy throughout the United States and Canada, as headliner in their home country and as support act in the US. Many of these concerts featured both bands on stage aiding each other in backup vocals on their own songs, and covers of Bruce Springsteen and Neil Young.

In 2011, the band was nominated for the Best New Group Award at the 2011 Juno Awards.

2013–2018: White Paint, 111 Songs & Born Yesterday
On February 26, 2013, the band released their second LP, White Paint, leading with the single "Pick Me Up". The album "finds Hollerado sticking to their guns by packing their songs with instantly hummable choruses and six-string riffs aplenty," but although the band didn't opt for any huge sound changes for their second album, White Paint "is a more intricately wrought and emotionally complex record than the feel-good Record in a Bag". The track "So It Goes", along with its accompanying video, garnered attention for its historical and emotional story that involved the sparing of lead singer Menno's grandfather's life during World War II.

In January 2015 Hollerado began releasing tracks for their ambitious 111 Songs project, leading with the single "Firefly". The project stemmed from a release package ordered by fans of their previous record White Paint on which Hollerado has stated "as part of the deal we would write them a custom song. The idea was the person would send us their name and where they were from and two facts about themselves, and a few months later we would send them a song we wrote for them." 111 Songs actually resulted in two years of work on the songs, dedicated to those fans and is stepping stone to the band's third full-length album.

On January 6, 2017, Hollerado's first single from their third studio album "Born Yesterday" was released. In February and March, they toured the UK with fellow Canadian pop punk outfit, Sum 41 on their "Don't Call It A Sum-Back Tour". Born Yesterday was released on 14 April 2017.

2019: Retaliation Vacation and disbandment
On February 20, 2019, Hollerado announced via a press release that they would be parting ways after releasing one last self-produced album, entitled "Retaliation Vacation", and embarking on a final tour titled The One Last Time Tour.

The band played their final shows on December 11, 12 and 13 at the Danforth Music Hall along with an exclusive final performance at the Horseshoe Tavern in Toronto, Canada on December 14, 2019. Corey van den Hoogenband from Exclaim, cited their final performance at the Danforth Music Hall as "the perfect goodbye after a decade full of confetti, white paint and peace signs."

Awards and nominations

Juno Awards

|-
|  || Hollerado || Best New Group|| 
|-
|  || Hollerado - Good Day At The Races || Video of the Year|| 
|-
|  || Hollerado - White Paint || Recording Package of the Year|| 
|-

Sirius XM Indie Awards

|-
| 2012 || Hollerado || Live Artist/Group Or Duo of the Year|| 
|-
| 2014 || Hollerado || Live Artist/Group Or Duo of the Year|| 
|-
| 2014 || Hollerado || Artist/Group Or Duo of the Year|| 
|-
| 2014 || Hollerado - So It Goes || Video of the Year|| 
|-

Edge 102 CASBY Awards

|-
| 2013 || Hollerado || Favourite Sugar Beach Session|| 
|-

Members
Menno Versteeg – guitar, lead vocals (2007–2019)
Nixon Boyd – guitar, vocals (2007–2019)
Dean Baxter – bass, vocals (2007–2019)
Jake Boyd – drums, vocals (2007–2019)

Discography

Albums
 Record in a Bag (2009, re-released 2010)
 White Paint (2013)
 Born Yesterday (2017)
 Retaliation Vacation (2019)

Demos
 Demo in a Bag One (2007)
 Demo in a Bag Two (2007)
 Demo in a Bag Three (2007)
 Demo in a Bag Four (2007)
 Demo in a Bag Five (2008)

Other releases
 Margaritaville 2: The Reckoning(2011)
 111 Songs (2015)

Singles

See also

Music of Canada
Canadian rock
List of Canadian musicians
List of bands from Canada

References

Musical groups established in 2007
Musical groups disestablished in 2019
Canadian musical groups
Canadian indie rock groups
Musical groups from Ottawa
Musical groups from Montreal
Arts & Crafts Productions artists
2007 establishments in Ontario
2019 disestablishments in Ontario